Gros Noyer – Saint-Prix is a railway station in the commune of Ermont (Val-d'Oise department), France. The station is served by Transilien H trains from Paris to Persan-Beaumont via Saint-Leu-la-Forêt. The daily number of passengers was between 2,500 and 7,500 in 2002. The station has 2 free parking lots with 20 and 150 places. Le Gros Noyer – Saint-Prix is located on the line from Ermont-Eaubonne to Valmondois, that was opened in 1876. The line was electrified in 1970.

Bus connections

Cars Rose: 38.03
Nearby: Busval d'Oise: 95.03B

Gallery

See also
List of SNCF stations in Île-de-France

References

External links

 

Railway stations in Val-d'Oise